Union Monégasque is a centrist political party in the Principality of Monaco. Union Monégasque was formed in 2003 and is led by Jean-François Robillon. In the most recent elections on 11 February 2018 it won 16.2 percent of the vote and 1 seat.

Union Monégasque promotes and formulates political proposals aimed at bringing together the Monegasque population around common values according to the founding principles it has adopted. Pride, unity and ambition are the three founding pillars of the political group.

Electoral history

National Council elections

See also
Politics of Monaco
List of political parties in Monaco

References

External links
Official website
Union Monégasque : 24 Candidats en Scène
Union Monégasque on Twitter

Monarchist parties in Monaco
Monegasque nationalism
Political parties established in 2003